Lina Persson (born February 3, 1982) is a Swedish orienteering competitor and European champion. She received a gold medal in the relay event at the 2008 European Orienteering Championships in Ventspils, together with Emma Engstrand and Helena Jansson. She qualified for the finals and finished 10th in the long distance and 12th in the middle distance at the 2008 European championships.

References

External links
 
 Lina Persson at World of O Runners

1982 births
Living people
Swedish orienteers
Female orienteers
Foot orienteers
Junior World Orienteering Championships medalists